"That's What Friends Are For" is a 1982 song written by Burt Bacharach and Carole Bayer Sager, best known from the 1985 version by Dionne Warwick and Friends.

That's What Friends Are For may also refer to:

"That's What Friends Are For" (Barbara Mandrell song), 1976
"That's What Friends Are For" (Deniece Williams song), 1977
"That's What Friends Are For" (Modern Romance song), 1984
"That's What Friends Are For" (Slade song), 1987
"That's What Friends Are For" (The Swarbriggs song), representing Ireland at Eurovision 1975
"That's What Friends Are For (The Vulture Song)", from the 1967 Disney film The Jungle Book
That's What Friends Are For (Johnny Mathis and Deniece Williams album), 1978
That's What Friends Are For (The Moondogs album), 1981
"That's What Friends Are For?", an episode of the TV series Hannah Montana